Harbor Bluffs is a census-designated place (CDP) in Pinellas County, Florida, United States. The population was 2,860 at the 2010 census.

Geography
Harbor Bluffs is located at  (27.907699, -82.825074).

According to the United States Census Bureau, the CDP has a total area of 2.5 km2 (0.9 mi2), of which 1.8 km2 (0.7 mi2) is land and 0.7 km2 (0.3 mi2) (27.37%) is water.

Demographics

As of the census of 2000, there were 2,807 people, 1,186 households, and 876 families residing in the CDP.  The population density was 1,548.3/km2 (4,030.3/mi2).  There were 1,251 housing units at an average density of 690.0/km2 (1,796.2/mi2).  The racial makeup of the CDP was 97.04% White, 0.11% African American, 0.04% Native American, 1.57% Asian, 0.25% from other races, and 1.00% from two or more races. Hispanic or Latino of any race were 1.96% of the population.

There were 1,186 households, out of which 25.7% had children under the age of 18 living with them, 66.4% were married couples living together, 5.6% had a female householder with no husband present, and 26.1% were non-families. 21.8% of all households were made up of individuals, and 13.2% had someone living alone who was 65 years of age or older.  The average household size was 2.36 and the average family size was 2.76.

In the CDP, the population was spread out, with 19.3% under the age of 18, 3.6% from 18 to 24, 22.8% from 25 to 44, 30.7% from 45 to 64, and 23.6% who were 65 years of age or older.  The median age was 47 years. For every 100 females, there were 93.1 males.  For every 100 females age 18 and over, there were 91.1 males.

The median income for a household in the CDP was $61,397, and the median income for a family was $68,000. Males had a median income of $49,943 versus $30,900 for females. The per capita income for the CDP was $39,261.  About 3.9% of families and 5.7% of the population were below the poverty line, including 8.9% of those under age 18 and 8.4% of those age 65 or over.

References

Unincorporated communities in Pinellas County, Florida
Census-designated places in Pinellas County, Florida
Census-designated places in Florida
Unincorporated communities in Florida
Populated places on the Intracoastal Waterway in Florida